Sölve was a sea-king who conquered Sweden by burning the Swedish king Östen to death inside his hall.

The Heimskringla relates that he was the son of Högne of Nærøy, and that he had his home in Jutland (however, according to the older source Historia Norwegiae, he was Geatish). He pillaged in the Baltic Sea and at night they made shore in the hundred of Lofond/Lovund (perhaps Lovön or the Lagunda Hundred) where they surrounded a house and set it on fire killing everybody inside. In the house there was a feast where the Swedish king Östen was invited. Then Sölve and his men arrived in Sigtuna (Old Sigtuna) and declared that the Swedes had to accept him as king. The Swedes refused and fought Sölve for eleven days until they lost. Sölve then ruled Sweden until the Swedes rebelled and killed him.

Historia Norwegiae only relates that the Geats burnt Östen and his people to death inside his house.

Sölvi also appears in Half's saga, of which there is a version from the year 1300. This saga relates that Sölvi was the son of Högne the rich of Nærøy fyrir Naumundalsminni in Norway and that he was the brother of Hild the Slender. Sölvi's brother-in-law, Hjorleiv, was the king of Hordaland and Rogaland and Hjorleiv killed Hreidar, the king of Zealand. Then Hjorleiv put Sölvi as the jarl of Zealand. Later in the saga, Sölvi is no longer the jarl of Zealand, but the king of Sweden. Hjorleiv had a son named Half (after whom the saga is named), and after the Norwegian king Asmund had killed Half, a couple of his champions go to Sweden and king Sölvi (til svíþjóðar ; fóru þeir ... á fund Sölva konungs) (see also Gard Agdi).

Sölvi is also mentioned in a few other sources, but none of them relate of his Danish and Swedish dominions.

He was succeeded by Ingvar of the Swedish royal dynasty, the House of Yngling.

References

Primary sources 
 Ynglingatal
 Ynglinga saga (part of the Heimskringla)

Viking warriors
Semi-legendary kings of Sweden
7th-century rulers in Europe